Holly is an unincorporated community in Kanawha County, West Virginia, United States, situated along Cabin Creek.

References 

Unincorporated communities in West Virginia
Unincorporated communities in Kanawha County, West Virginia